Kate Muriel Mason Eadie   (4 May 1880 – 8 November 1945) was a British jeweller and craftswoman in Birmingham, working in the Arts and Crafts style. In September 1940, she married the Birmingham Pre-Raphaelite painter Sidney Meteyard, whom she met when she studied at Birmingham School of Art, having modelled for many of his pictures, including Jasmine. They worked together on stained glass.

A well as jewellery, she made larger items such as fire screens.

In 1915, she was elected an associate of the Royal Birmingham Society of Artists, with whom she had exhibited a case of jewellery in 1908–1909, a processional cross in 1909, and another case of jewellery in 1911.

At one time, she lived at The Malthouse, Evesham Road, Cookhill, Alcester, Warwickshire, with her sisters,  and with Meteyard.

She died on 8 November 1945.

References

External links 
 Jasmine, by Sidney Harold Meteyard

1880 births
1945 deaths
Arts and Crafts movement artists
Artists from Birmingham, West Midlands
Members and Associates of the Royal Birmingham Society of Artists
English jewellers
Alumni of the Birmingham School of Art
Women jewellers